The Veer is an option running play often associated with option offenses in American football.

Veer may also refer to:

Film and television
Veer!, a 2012 American independent film directed by Patrick Barry
Veer (2010 film), a Bollywood film starring Mithun Chakraborty, Salman Khan and Jackie Shroff
Veer (1995 film), an Indian film

People
Naqeebullah Mehsud (1991–2018), also known as "Veer", a Pakistani national ethnic Pashtun who was killed in a fake police encounter
Veer Savarkar (1883-1966), Indian freedom fighter
Rinku Singh (wrestler) (born 1988), a professional wrestler with the ring name Veer

Others
Veer Towers, condominium buildings in Paradise, Nevada
HP Veer, a 2011 smartphone by Hewlett-Packard
, a Vidyut-class missile boat of the Indian Navy
, a Veer-class corvette of the Indian Navy
VeeR VR, a Chinese technology company headquartered in Beijing, focused on virtual reality contents
One of Navarasa, in Indian aesthetics and literature

See also

Veering, a movement of the air; see